Samuel Abate (born 9 March 1999) is an Ethiopian middle and long-distance runner, who specializes in the 1500 metres.

In January 2021, he finished third in the 1500m at a pre-Olympic trial meeting in Addis Ababa, running 3:41.60 to finish behind Teddese Lemi and Kebede Endale. In June he ran a qualifying time for the 2020 Summer Olympics with a 3:32.80 performance at the Ethiopian Olympic Trials, finishing second to Lemi in the race. He finished fifth at the Tokyo Olympics in the second heat of the 1500 metres.

References

External links
 

1999 births
Living people
Ethiopian middle-distance runners
Ethiopian long-distance runners
Athletes (track and field) at the 2020 Summer Olympics
Olympic athletes of Ethiopia